Makgabo Reginah Mhaule is the Deputy Minister of Basic Education in South Africa. She is the Former MEC of Education in the Mpumalanga Provincial Government under the Administration of David Mabuza. She was appointed as Deputy Minister of International Relations and Cooperation after President Cyril Ramaphosa announced a Cabinet Reshuffle in February 2018. She has also served as Mayor of the City of Mbombela Local Municipality. She was born in 1961.

See also

African Commission on Human and Peoples' Rights
Constitution of South Africa
History of the African National Congress
Politics in South Africa
Provincial governments of South Africa

References

Government ministers of South Africa
Women government ministers of South Africa
Living people
1961 births
Members of the National Assembly of South Africa